Agalar Idrisoglu (born March 16, 1950) is an Azerbaijani writer, dramatist, stage director and publisher.

He was born in Digah, Masally, Azerbaijan SSR, USSR. He was a "Gizil Dervish" prize winner, Presidential scholar and Honored Artist of the Republic of Azerbaijan.

References

External links
Agalar İdrisoglu (1950) – el escritor,  el dramaturgo

1950 births
Azerbaijani writers
Azerbaijani dramatists and playwrights
Opinion journalists
Azerbaijani theatre directors
Living people
People from Masally District
20th-century Azerbaijani dramatists and playwrights
21st-century Azerbaijani dramatists and playwrights